Marleen Caroline Valère Vanderpoorten (born 21 July 1954) Belgian politician from Flanders and member of the Flemish Liberals and Democrats (VLD). She is a daughter of Herman Vanderpoorten and a granddaughter of Arthur Vanderpoorten. She obtained a degree in history from the University of Ghent (Ghent, Belgium).

From 1999 to 2004 she was the Minister of Education in the Flemish Government. On 12 July 2006 she succeeded Norbert De Batselier as President of the Flemish Parliament, and on 13 July 2009 Jan Peumans succeeded her.

Political career

 Municipal Councillor in Lier (since 1989)
 Alderman in Lier (1989–1995)
 Mayor of Lier (1995–1999 and since 2004)
 Provincial Councillor in Antwerp (1987–1991)
 Member of the Flemish Parliament (1995–1999 and since 2004)
 Minister of Education in the Flemish Government (1999–2004)
 President of the Flemish Parliament (2006–2009)

External links
 Marleen Vanderpoorten - (Only available in Dutch)

1954 births
Ghent University alumni
Living people
Open Vlaamse Liberalen en Democraten politicians
People from Lier, Belgium
21st-century Belgian politicians
21st-century Belgian women politicians